Brod na Kupi is a village located 12 km north of Delnice, in the western part of Gorski Kotar in Croatia. A bridge connects it with Petrina in Slovenia. Its population is 207 (2011 census).

References

Populated places in Primorje-Gorski Kotar County